Darrien Landsberg (born ) is a Zimbabwean rugby union player for the  in the Currie Cup. His regular position is lock.

He joined the  ahead of the newly formed Super Rugby Unlocked competition in October 2020.

References

Zimbabwean rugby union players
Living people
1998 births
Rugby union locks
Pumas (Currie Cup) players
Golden Lions players
Lions (United Rugby Championship) players